The 13th Grey Cup was played on December 5, 1925, before 6,900 fans at the Lansdowne Park at Ottawa.

The Ottawa Senators defeated the Winnipeg Tammany Tigers 24–1.

External links
 
 

Grey Cup
Grey Cup, 13th
Grey Cup
1925 in Ontario
December 1925 sports events
1920s in Ottawa
Ottawa Rough Riders